The giant panda (Ailuropoda melanoleuca) is a bear native to south central China.

Giant panda may also refer to:

Giant Panda (group), an American hip-hop group
Giant Panda Guerilla Dub Squad, an American reggae and jam band
Giant panda snail Hedleyella falconeri

See also
Panda (disambiguation)